The Republic of Ireland have appeared in the Men's FIFA World Cup on three occasions, in 1990, 1994, and 2002. They have always advanced from the group stage but have never advanced beyond the quarter-finals.

Their first appearance was in Italy at the 1990 Men's FIFA World Cup. 1990 was also their best performance in a major championship, where they reached the quarter-finals, despite not winning a single match in 90 minutes.

Overall record

*Draws include knockout matches decided via penalty shoot-out.

1990 World Cup

Group F

Note: Republic of Ireland awarded second place by drawing of lots

Knockout phase

1994 World Cup

Group E

Knockout phase

2002 World Cup

Group E

Knockout phase

Record players
Defender Steve Staunton has represented the Irish team in all of their thirteen World Cup matches, captaining the side in 2002.

Goalscorers

See also
 Republic of Ireland at the UEFA European Championship

References

External links
Ireland Profile at FIFA.com
Ireland World Cup Record at FIFA.com
Article on Ireland's Qualification for the 1990 World Cup
Article on Ireland at 1994 FIFA World Cup
World Cup Record at Planet World Cup

 
Ireland
World Cup